Kronk's New Groove (also known as The Emperor's New Groove 2: Kronk's New Groove) is a 2005 American direct-to-video animated musical comedy film animated by Toon City Animation and released by Walt Disney Home Entertainment on December 13, 2005. The film is the sequel and spin-off to the 2000 animated film The Emperor's New Groove, and features reprises of the roles of David Spade, John Goodman, Eartha Kitt, Patrick Warburton and Wendie Malick from the first film, with new voices by John Mahoney and Tracey Ullman. It was also the last film to feature the voice of John Fiedler, who died six months before it was released.

Plot
Emperor Kuzco (David Spade) narrates the story about Kronk Pepikrankenitz (Patrick Warburton), now chef and Head Delivery Boy of Mudka's Meat Hut, who is fretting over the upcoming visit of his father. Kronk's father always disapproved of young Kronk's culinary interests and wished that Kronk instead would settle down with a wife and a large house on a hill.

In a flashback, Kronk tells the story of how he almost had both of these. As unwitting accomplice to Yzma (Eartha Kitt) – the villainess of the first film who turned into a cat at the end of the original, but is now human again despite still having a tail – he goes along with her plan to sell sewer slime as a youth potion. He makes enough money to buy the old folks' home from the old folks and put his large new home there. Eventually, Yzma is revealed as a fake and the old folks chase her down and corner her at a bridge over a river full of crocodiles. To prevent them from attacking her, she transforms herself into a rabbit, but is then caught and taken away by a condor. When Kronk realizes the old folks have sold everything they own in return for something which doesn't work, he gives his home back to them.

Kronk, as camp counselor of the Junior Chipmunks at Camp Chippamunka, falls in love with fellow counselor Miss Birdwell (Tracey Ullman); but when one of his Chipmunks, Tipo, pulls a prank to win the camp championships and is caught, Kronk, feeling responsible for the situation (due to having previously told his Chipmunks to do whatever it took to win), protects the boy at the cost of alienating his love.

Kronk's father (John Mahoney) arrives and confusion ensues as several supportive friends try to pass themselves off to him as Kronk's wife and kids. But in the end, Kronk realizes that his wealth is in his friendships, and this finally wins his father's thumbs up and Miss Birdwell's love.

Meanwhile, just outside the house, Yzma is in the condor's nest with two eggs, which hatch and presumably attack her before the credits roll.

Cast

 Patrick Warburton as Kronk
 Tracey Ullman as Miss Birdwell
 Eartha Kitt as Yzma
 David Spade as Kuzco
 John Goodman as Pacha
 Wendie Malick as Chicha
 John Mahoney as Papi
 John Fiedler as Rudy
 Bob Bergen as Bucky
 Eli Russell Linnetz as Tipo
 Patti Deutsch as Waitress
 Jessie Flower as Chaca
 Anthony Ghannam as Huayna
 Jeff Bennett as Skinny Old Man / Stout Old Man / Gollum-Rudy
 April Winchell as Hildy / Marge / Tina

Reception
Pam Gelman of Common Sense Media gave the film two out of five stars, stating that the film's story "is disjointed with unnecessary attempts at humor that are clearly geared for parents". David Nusair of Reel Film Reviews states the main character "works best in small doses; forced to carry an entire movie, Kronk becomes tedious and (unbelievable as it seems) unfunny."

Annie Awards
The film was nominated in 2006 for the following Annie Awards:

 Best Home Entertainment Production 
 Best Storyboarding in an Animated Feature Production 
 Best Writing in an Animated Feature Production

References

External links

 
 
 

2005 films
2005 animated films
2005 direct-to-video films
2000s American animated films
2000s musical comedy films
American musical comedy films
American sequel films
Direct-to-video sequel films
Disney direct-to-video animated films
DisneyToon Studios animated films
Films about sportspeople
Films about potions
Films with screenplays by Tony Leondis
Indigenous cinema in Latin America
The Emperor's New Groove (franchise)
2005 comedy films
Films about witchcraft
Films scored by Jeanine Tesori
Films scored by Mark Watters
Animated films about squirrels
2000s English-language films